The Best Damn Tour: Live in Toronto is a live music DVD from Canadian singer Avril Lavigne. It was shot at the sold-out Air Canada Centre concert in Toronto, Ontario, Canada on April 7, 2008 during the Best Damn Tour. It was released on September 9, 2008 in North America and on September 5, 2008 in Europe. In the USA there were clean and explicit versions of the DVD.

Background

The Best Damn World Tour was the third concert tour by Avril Lavigne. It supported her third studio album The Best Damn Thing, and visited North America, Europe, and Asia. It was also her first concert in three years, following the Bonez Tour in 2005. The tour was announced on November 6, 2007 at the West Hollywood nightclub Whisky a Go Go. Lavigne intended for the tour to be "showy," commenting that the "theme is like a party!" The tour included backup dancers, outfit changes, and a moving stage, with Lavigne hiring three choreographers—Lindsey Blaufarb, Craig Hollaman and Jamie King—in order to achieve her intended theme and vision. The tour garnered mixed reviews from contemporary critics.

After the tour was over, industry reports presented that it earned US$12.3 million ($ million in  dollars) in total, from 110 shows and eventually played in front of nearly 170,000 people throughout North America, Europe, and Asia averaging at $861,599 ($ million in  dollars) per show. Despite the cancellation of the tour's final North American dates, The Best Damn Tour became Lavigne's highest-grossing concert tour.

Synopsis
The concert starts off with an anonymous source spraying "Avril" on the screen in black graffiti, and then is colored in with bright pink. When its fully colored, pink lights shine, stars flash on the screen and her back up dancers run on with pink flags displaying the logo of her third album. A short instrumental of "Girlfriend" plays, as the flags are waved across the stage. Lavigne comes up on an elevator to perform "Girlfriend". Lavigne briefly talks to the audience and introduces the next track "I Can Do Better". 
Throughout the concert, Lavigne plays acoustic and electric guitar, drums and piano. A selection of tracks include "Sk8er Boi", "My Happy Ending", "When You're Gone" and the remix of "Girlfriend" featuring Lil' Mama.

Track listing
Taken from the back casing of The Best Damn Tour: Live in Toronto US DVD release.

Notes
 MTV Live premiered a condensed 54-minute version of the concert on January 10, 2009, omitting the performances of "I Can Do Better", "I Always Get What I Want", "Best Damn Dance Break", "Hot", "Everything Back but You", and "I Don't Have to Try".

Personnel 
Credits adapted from The Best Damn Tour: Live in Toronto DVD liner notes.

Avril Lavigne – main performer, vocals, rhythm guitar
Wayne Isham – director
Jamie King – director for the stage
Chuck Ozeas – director of photography
Dana Marshall – producer
Samantha Lecca – executive producer
Joseph Uliano – executive producer
Neil Maiers – executive producer
Carla Kama – assistant stage director
Jamie King – choreographer
Lindsey Blaufarb – choreographer, dancer
Craig Hollaman – choreographer
Sofia Toufa – additional choreographer, dancer, vocals
Deryck Whibley – audio mixing, back cover photo
Bob Ludwig – audio mastering
Jim McGorman – music director, rhythm guitar, vocals
Stephen Ferlazzo – keyboards
Al Berry – bass
Rodney Howard – drums
Steve Fekete – lead guitar
Jaime Burgos III – dancer
Jesse Brown – dancer
Sara Von Gillern – dancer
Caitlin Lotz – dancer, vocals
Tina Kennedy – manager
Dan Cleland – tour manager
Derick Henry – director of security
Matthew Lavigne – security
Jon Zivcovic – security
Dale Lynch – production manager
Gail Nishi – tour assistant
Brian Kutzman – guitar tech
Ian O'Neill – drum tech
Brent Clark – lighting director
Matt Peskie – monitor engineer
Jim Yakubushi – FOH engineer
Mikee Cusack – merchandisers
Josh Briand – merchandisers
Mark "Sparky" Mcilvenna – lead driver
Gabriel Panduro – hair/makeup
Louise Kennedy – wardrobe supervisor
Amie Darlow – artist wardrobe/assistant
Leah Smith – costumer
William Crooks – video screen director
Daniel DeShara – video screen engineer
Daryn Barry – audio mixing at Orange Lounge, audio recording engineer
Geoff McLean – Toronto production supervisor
William Crooks – technical director
Connie Isham – script supervisor
Kelsey Larkin – production coordinator
Hayden Currie – production assistant
Quillan Docherty – production assistant
Adam Angeloni – production assistant
Alan Sukonnik – production assistant
Simon Rodriguez – production assistant
Jeff Schwartz – production assistant
Eric Oh – Steadicam operator
George Lajtais – crane operator
Jean Pellerin – camera operators
Alex Poppas – camera operators
John Asquwith – camera operators
Ted Perrotta – camera operators
Jim Flaxman – camera operators
Steven Chung – camera operators
Alex Gomez – camera operators
Michael Bailey – camera assistants
Joe Chan – camera assistants
Laina Knox – camera assistants
Mike G – key grip
Peter Newman – best boy grip
Justin Beattie – grip
Anthoni Shilello – crane assistant
Dome Productions – video truck
Ivar Boriss – video truck manager
Dave Schick – video truck tech manager
Chris Romanick – technical director
Elliott Cristofoli – engineers
Andrew Poisson – engineers
Bryan Bosley – engineers
John Carlyle – audio operator #1
Edward Lundy – audio operator #2
Pat Denardis – evs operator
Mark Scott – video operator
Victor Bruck – video operator
Andrew Budziak – associated telecasters
Jordan Szabo – associated telecasters
Matt Dorozovec – associated telecasters
Cory Dynes – associated telecasters
Veneno, Inc. – screen imagery
Editgods – edit facility
Guy Harding – editors
Matt Edwards – editors
Hector Lopez – online edit, colorist
The Audio Truck, Inc. – audio mobile
Doug McClement – mobile music recording engineer, audio assistants
Jason "Metal" Donkersgoed – Pro Tools engineer
Alex Bonenfant – Pro Tools engineer
Danny Greenspoon – truck engineer
Sam Ibbett – audio assistants
Billy Burgomaster – audio assistants
Terry McBride – management
Mark Liddell – front cover photo
David Bergman – all other photos
John Rummen – DVD cover design
Kim Kinakin – DVD package design

Charts

Certifications

Release history

References

2008 video albums
Avril Lavigne video albums
Live video albums
RCA Records video albums